Shahe could refer to the following towns in China:

Written as "沙河镇"

Anhui
Shahe, Chuzhou

Gansu
Shahe, Linze County

Guangxi
Shahe, Bobai County

Jiangsu
Shahe, Ganyu County

Jiangxi
Shahe, Ganzhou

Jilin
Shahe, Dongfeng County

Liaoning
Shahe, Anshan
Shahe, Suizhong County

Shandong
Shahe, Laizhou

Shaanxi
Shahe, Xixiang County

Sichuan
Shahe, Gao County
Shahe, Guangyuan
Shahe, Nanjiang County

Other written forms
Shahe, Fanshi County, Shanxi (砂河镇)